The Fairfield Stags men's basketball team represents Fairfield University in Fairfield, Connecticut and competes in the Metro Atlantic Athletic Conference of NCAA Division I. The Stags play their home games in the 3,500 seat Leo D. Mahoney Arena on campus. The team is currently coached by Jay Young, his fourth year at the helm.

The Stags have experienced post-season tournament action fourteen times having competed in the NAIA Tournament in 1951; the NCAA DII Tournament in 1960, 1961 and 1962; the National Invitational Tournament in 1973, 1974, 1978, 1996, 2003; and 2011 NIT; and the NCAA Division I men's basketball tournament in 1986, 1987 and 1997. In the 1973 National Invitation Tournament, the Stags advanced to the second round where the team lost by one point to eventual champion Virginia Tech.  And in the 1997 NCAA tournament, the Stags nearly achieved a historical upset of top-seeded North Carolina after leading the Tar Heels by seven points at halftime. The team also won the MAAC Regular Season Title in 1986 and the MAAC Championship Tournament in 1986, 1987 and 1997.

Individually, Joe DeSantis earned All-American honors in 1979; Darren Phillip was the nation's top rebounder averaging 14 rebounds per game in 2000; and Deng Gai was the nation's top shot blocker in 2005 averaging 5.5 blocks per game which ranks #5 on the NCAA's all-time blocked shot average list. Thirteen Stags have been either drafted or signed to play in the National Basketball Association.

History

Dawn of the Stags
Through the efforts of Rev. Victor Leeber, S.J., Fairfield University introduced men's basketball in 1948 and has played continuously since then. Fairfield played its first-ever game against Brooklyn College in Brooklyn, New York, losing 78–46, and won its first-ever game that season against Hillyer College (now the University of Hartford), 47–37, in Bridgeport, Connecticut, at the Bridgeport Armory, Fairfield's original home court.  During the 1950–51 season, under new Head Coach James Hanrahan, the program experienced its first winning season with a 16–11 record and received the school's first postseason berth in the 1951 NAIA National Men's Basketball Championship Tournament.

Red Stags rising
During the 1958–59 season Head Coach George Bisacca took over the program and proceeded to elevate the Stags to a higher level of success, experiencing only one losing season in 10 years.  The Stags received three straight postseason berths to the NCAA Men's Division II Basketball Championship Tournament between 1960 and 1962 and advanced to the second round in 1960 and 1961.  On the heels of this postseason success, Fairfield upgraded the program to NCAA Division I beginning with the 1964–65 season. The 1965–66 team went 19–5 and became the first Fairfield team to be ranked in one of the national polls.

The Golden Barakat era
The most successful stretch of Fairfield basketball occurred under Head Coach Fred Barakat when the Stags received three berths in the post-season NIT in six years which was chronicled in the book, 25 Years Plus One: Recounting the Meteoric Rise of Fairfield Basketball, by Connecticut sportswriter, Don Harrison.  During the 1972–73 season the Stags finished with an 18–9 overall record and were invited to the post-season NIT for the first time in the programs history.  In the 1st round, Captain George Groom led the Stags to an 80–76 victory over Marshall University playing before 13,904 fans at Madison Square Garden.  In the 2nd round, the Stags fell 76–77 to the eventual National Champion Virginia Tech Gobblers before more than 17,000 fans.  The Stags followed up this success with a 17–9 overall record and a second invitation to the post-season NIT during  the 1973–74 season.  In the 1st round, Captain Richie O'Connor led the Stags to a 37–32 halftime lead before falling 65–66 to the University of Hawaii before 17,739 fans.  The Stags returned to the post-season NIT for the third time during the 1977–78 season following the program's first 20 win season (22–5 overall) and a record point setting 123–108 victory over the then 14th ranked Holy Cross Crusaders.  In the 1st round of the tournament, Junior Mark Young led the Stags with a 32 performance in a 93–108 losing effort to the Dayton Flyers.

Back to backs in the MAAC
Fairfield earned its first berth in NCAA Men's Division I Basketball Championship in 1986 after sweeping through the St. Peter's Peacocks, Iona Gaels and Holy Cross Crusaders en route to winning the MAAC Championship.  The Stags faced the Illinois Fighting Illini in the first round of Southeast Regional of the 1986 NCAA Tournament.  The Stags featured five 1,000 point career scorers on this team including Tony George (program's all-time leading scorer with 2006 points), Troy Bradford (1648 points), Jeff Gromos (1429 points), A. J. Wynder (1313 points, drafted by the Boston Celtics in 1987), and Pat Yerina (1255 points). The Stags were coached by first year head coach Mitch Buonoguoro and ended the year with a 24–7 record, the most wins in school history.

The following season, Fairfield overcame an injured-plaqued season to mount an improbable run to its second consecutive MAAC Championship and to earn its second consecutive bid to the 1987 NCAA Tournament.  The Stags defeated the LaSalle Explorers, Army Black Knights and needed the heroics of a last second shot by A. J. Wynder to help propel the Stags past the Iona Gaels in overtime and to the MAAC Championship.  The Stags faced the top-seeded and eventual national champion Indiana Hoosiers in the first round of the Midwest Regional before 29,610 fans in the Hoosier Dome.  Jeff Gromos led all Fairfield scorers with 21 points, followed by A. J. Wynder with 15 points.

During the 1995–96 season Head Coach Paul Cormier led the Stags to a 20–10 overall record, an appearance in the MAAC championship game and the program's fourth berth in the NIT. In the opening round of the NIT, the Stags played the Providence College Friars before 6,368 fans at the New Haven Coliseum.  Led by Shannon Bowman the Stags held a 46–43 half time lead before eventually falling 78–69 to the Friars.

Picked to win the Metro Atlantic Athletic Conference in 1996–97, Fairfield suffered through an injury-plagued regular season and finished in last place. But the Stags made a Cinderella run in the MAAC tournament, defeating top seed Iona, St. Peter's and Canisius to capture the league's automatic berth in the 1997 NCAA Tournament despite an 11–18 record.  Fairfield then gave top seeded North Carolina all it could handle in the first round of the East Region in Winston-Salem, North Carolina.  The Stags opened a 37–28 lead early in the second half before their bid to become the first 16 seed to win an NCAA tournament game fell 82–74.  Stag legend Greg Francis '97 almost single-handedly upset the Tar Heels scoring 26 points including eight three-pointers. Following the game, legendary North Carolina coach Dean Smith said "I had to find Francis after the game but I couldn't shake his hand because it was so hot."

O'Toole time
In 2002, Stags basketball moved from the on-campus Alumni Hall to the new 9,500 seat Webster Bank Arena in Bridgeport, Connecticut.  During that same season, Head Coach Tim O'Toole '87 led the Stags to a 19–12 overall record, an appearance to the MAAC tournament championship game, and the program's fifth berth in the  NIT. In the opening round of the NIT, Nick Delfico led the Stags with 14 points in a 90–78 losing effort to the Boston College Eagles before 6,500 fans at the arena.  During 2004–05 season, Deng Gai '05 led the nation in shots blocked with 5.5 blocks per game and graduated as number eight on the NCAA's all-time blocked shots list.

Cooley and the Gang
On April 11, 2006, Ed Cooley (former Boston College Eagles assistant coach) became the program's eleventh Head Coach ushering in a new era of Stags basketball.  During the first round of the 2010 CollegeInsider.com Postseason Tournament (CIT) the Stags overcame a 27-point deficit with 16:08 left to play to defeat George Mason in overtime, 101–96. The 27-point comeback is the biggest in Division I postseason history.  The Stags were led by senior Mike Evanovich who finished with a career-high 32 points and a school record nine three-pointers including one with 0.9 seconds in regulation to send the game into overtime. Fellow senior Anthony Johnson led the Stags in overtime scoring 9 points and finished with 25 points in the game.  And at the conclusion of the 2010 season, Coach Cooley received the inaugural 2010 Ben Jobe National Coach of the Year Award, presented annually to the top minority men's basketball coach in the nation, in recognition of his coaching the Stags through numerous injuries to a near school record 23-win season and Derek Needham was named a Freshman All-American.  During the 2010–11 season, Fairfield won the MAAC regular season title and earned a berth in the 2011 NIT where the Stags beat the Colorado State Rams, 62–60, in the first round. Additionally, Coach Ed Cooley and sophomore Derek Needham earned recognition from the United States Basketball Writers Association (USBWA) with Cooley named the District I Coach of the Year and Needham selected to the District I-New England team.

Johnson era
In April 2011, Johnson accepted a head coaching position at Fairfield University, replacing Ed Cooley. He coached the 2011–12 Stags to the semifinals of the 2012 CollegeInsider.com Postseason Tournament where they lost to Mercer, after defeating Yale, Manhattan and Robert Morris to finish with a 22–15 record. Mercer went on to win the tournament. For the second season in a row, he was a finalist for the Ben Jobe Award. The 2012–13 team started the season 10–10 (2–6) before winning five consecutive and seven out of eight Metro Atlantic Athletic Conference games. The team then lost its two final conference games to finish 9–9 in conference. Eventually the team finished 19–15 (9–9).

All-time head coaches

Postseason

NCAA Division I Tournament results
The Stags have appeared in the NCAA Division I Tournament three times. Their combined record is 0–3.

NCAA Division II Tournament results
The Stags have appeared in the NCAA Division II Tournament three times. Their combined record is 2–4.

NIT results
The Stags have appeared in the National Invitation Tournament (NIT) six times. Their combined record is 2–6.

CIT results
The Stags have appeared in the CollegeInsider.com Postseason Tournament (CIT) five times. Their combined record is 4–5.

Awards

All-time statistic leaders

Stags in the pros
The following Stags play or played professional basketball across the globe:

Stags in the NBA Draft
The following Stag players were selected in the National Basketball Association draft:

Stags in coaching
The following Stags coached or are coaching basketball at the collegiate level:

WVOF radio broadcasts
WVOF is the home of Fairfield Stags men's basketball. Men's basketball coverage is led  play-by-play analyst Bob Heussler with color commentary from Stag basketball legend Joe DeSantis '79.

References

External links